(20 August, 1876 – 1, January, 1957) was the pen name of , a Japanese tanka poet and calligrapher.

Biography
Saishū wrote a poetry column for the magazine Shinsei ("New Voices"). He also founded the Shazensō Sha ("Plantain Society") in 1905, which stressed clarity, simplicity, and capturing ordinary experiences in poetry. This was in reaction to the style of the tanka poets associated with Myōjō magazine (such as Yosano Akiko) which emphasized the passionate side of human nature. Members of the Shazensō Sha included the noted Naturalist tanka poets Wakayama Bokusui and  Maeda Yūgure (who had been tutored by Onoe Saishū).

References

1876 births
1957 deaths
Japanese poets